Xibali railway station is a station on the Beijing–Baotou railway located in the town of Xibali, Huailai County, Hebei.

See also
 List of stations on Jingbao railway

External links

Railway stations in Hebei